Rebecca Miller is a Canadian country music artist. Her 1995 single "Listen to the Radio" reached the Top 20 of the RPM Country Tracks chart. An album was planned for release, but shelved when her record label closed. In 2009, she was signed to Crystal Shawanda's label, New Sun Records.

Discography

Singles

References

Canadian women country singers
Living people
Year of birth missing (living people)